Tysmenytsia Raion was an administrative raion (district) of Ivano-Frankivsk Oblast (province) in western Ukraine. It was created on December 8, 1966, as Ivano-Frankivsk Raion. Since March 28, 1982 the name of raion was changed to Tysmenytsia when the administrative center of it became the city of Tysmenytsia. The raion was abolished on 18 July 2020 as part of the administrative reform of Ukraine, which reduced the number of raions of Ivano-Frankivsk Oblast Oblast to six. The area of Tysmenytsia Raion was merged into Ivano-Frankivsk Raion.

Subdivisions
At the time of disestablishment, the raion consisted of six hromadas:
 Lysets settlement hromada with the administration in the urban-type settlement of Lysets;
 Tysmenytsia urban hromada with the administration in Tysmenytsia;
 Uhryniv rural hromada with the administration in the selo of Uhryniv;
 Yamnytsia rural hromada with the administration in the selo of Yamnytsia;
 Yezupil settlement hromada with the administration in the urban-type settlement of Yezupil;
 Zahvizdia rural hromada with the administration in the selo of Zahvizdia.

Geography
The raion was located near the eastern border of Ivano-Frankivsk Oblast. To the north it bordered Halych Raion, to the west – Kalush and Bohorodchany raions, to the south – Kolomyia and Nadvirna raions, and to the east – Tlumach Raion with small portion of an oblast demarcation line with Ternopil Oblast. The raion completely surrounded Ivano-Frankivsk Municipality with numerous villages bordering with it and are part of the city's infrastructure: Uhryniv, Yamnytsia, Drahomyrchany, Zahvizdya, and others.

The oldest settlements in the raion were Cherniiv (1404), Stari Kryvotuly (1436), Uhryniv (1440), and others.

Government
 Executive: Head of Raion State Administration – Volodymyr Semeniv
 Legislative: Raion Council (85 seats): Chairman – Mykola Nahornyi (Rukh)
 Tysmenytsia City municipality
 Yezupil Town municipality
 Lysets Town municipality
 41 rural municipalities (communes) encompassing 48 villages

Education
There were 43 general education schools in the raion with the best ones located in Tysmenytsia, Yezupil, Lysets, Markivtsi, Radcha, Stari Kryvotuly, Chorny Lis, and Uhryniv.

Administrative division
Tysmenytsia Raion was divided into several municipalities (councils) some which are urban, others are rural. There were two types of urban municipalities: city and settlement (township). Rural municipalities (communes) may consist of a single village or combined into several villages, however most of the rural municipalities consisted of a single village. Also, the city of Tysmenytsia carried a special status of independent administration within the raion.
Urban (city, township)
Yezupil
Lysets
Tysmenytsia

Rural (communes)

Berezivka
Bratkivtsi
Cherniiv
Chornoliztsi
Chukalivka
Dobrovlyany
Dovhe
Drahomyrchany
Hannusivka
Khomiakivka
Klubivtsi
Kluziv
Kozyna
Kolodiivka
Lypivka (Nova Lypivka, Studynets)
Maidan (Nova Huta)
Markivtsi (Odayi)
Myluvannia
Novi Kryvotuly (Ternovytsia)
Pavlivka
Pidluzhia
Pidlissia
Pidpechery
Poberezhia
Posich
Pshenychnyky (Pohonya)
Radcha
Rybne
Roshniv
Silets
Slobidka
Staryi Kryvotuly (Krasylivka)
Staryi Lysets
Stebnyk
Stryhantsi
Tiaziv
Uhryniv
Uzyn
Vilshanytsia
Yamnytsia
Zahvizdia

Ten most populous
 Tysmenytsia 9,720
 Cherniiv 3,972
 Stary Lysets 3,795
 Zahvizdya 3,684
 Yamnytsia 3,358
 Uhryniv 3,227
 Stari Kryvotuly 3,112
 Chornoliztsi 3,097
 Radcha 3,062
 Yezupil 3,026

Most of the populous municipalities were located next to Ivano-Frankivsk city virtually serving as the extraterritorial units of it (suburbs). The smallest municipality of the raion was the Posich municipality which in 2001 accounted to only 84 residents. Note that as a settlement Posich was not the smallest.

References

External links

 Verkhovna Rada website - Administrative divisions on the Tysmenytsia raion
County of Tysmenytsia (English version)

Former raions of Ivano-Frankivsk Oblast
1966 establishments in Ukraine
Ukrainian raions abolished during the 2020 administrative reform